Utah State Route 181A may refer to:

 Utah State Route 181A (1945-1962) - former designation for roads on the campus of Dixie College (now Dixie State University) - now SR-281
 Utah State Route 181A (1962-1969) - former designation for roads on the campus of University of Utah - now SR-282